Battle of Vailele may refer to:
First Battle of Vailele
Second Battle of Vailele
Third Battle of Vailele